Harrison Township is one of eleven townships in Clay County, Indiana. As of the 2010 census, its population was 2,172 and it contained 1,040 housing units.

History
The Feeder Dam Bridge and Tide Water Pumping Station are listed on the National Register of Historic Places.

Geography

Cities and towns
 Clay City

Unincorporated towns
 Barrick Corner
 Eel River
 New Brunswick
 Old Hill
(This list is based on USGS data and may include former settlements.)

Adjacent townships
 Sugar Ridge Township (north)
 Washington Township (northeast)
 Marion Township, Owen County (east)
 Jefferson Township, Owen County (southeast)
 Smith Township, Greene County (south)
 Lewis Township (southwest)
 Perry Township (northwest)

Major highways
  Indiana State Road 59
  Indiana State Road 157
  Indiana State Road 246

Cemeteries
The township contains nine cemeteries: Cole, Duncan, Goshorn Memorial Park, Greenwell, Liechty, Maple Grove, Maple Grove, Sink and Wilson.

References
 
 United States Census Bureau cartographic boundary files

External links

 Indiana Township Association
 United Township Association of Indiana

Townships in Clay County, Indiana
Terre Haute metropolitan area
Townships in Indiana